Ipomoea hederifolia is a species of herbaceous annual vine native to the Americas. It was first described by Linnaeus in 1759.

It is commonly known as scarlet morning glory, scarlet creeper, star ipomoea, trompillo or ivy-leaved morning glory (which otherwise refers to I. hederacea).

References

External links

hederifolia
Plants described in 1759
Taxa named by Carl Linnaeus